Fabrício Silva Dornellas (born 20 February 1990) is a Brazilian professional footballer who plays as either a central or left-sided defender for Saudi Arabian club Hajer.

Fabrício represented Brazil at the 2009 FIFA U-20 World Cup, winning the silver medal.

Club career
Born in Niterói, Rio de Janeiro, Fabrício started out in the youth system of Flamengo. He made his senior debut with Paraná, as a loaned player, in the 2008 Campeonato Brasileiro Série B. In January 2009, Fabrício moved to Germany, being loaned to 1899 Hoffenheim, with a view to a permanent deal. He made six Bundesliga appearances in the remainder of the 2008–09 season, before returning to the Mengão. Until the end of the year, Fabrício made seven league appearances, helping the club win the 2009 Campeonato Brasileiro Série A.

In August 2010, Fabrício switched to Palmeiras, recording 16 league appearances until the end of the season. He then signed with Cruzeiro in January 2011, before leaving the club after only a few months, without making any appearances, to join Atlético Paranaense.

In March 2012, Fabrício was acquired by Vasco da Gama. In January 2013, Fabrício signed with Vitória. In May 2014, Fabrício joined Fluminense. He made five appearances until the end of the 2014 Campeonato Brasileiro Série A. After six months without a club, Fabrício joined Bragantino, signing a contract in May 2015.

Partizan
On 18 June 2015, Fabrício was transferred to Serbian club Partizan, on a season-long loan. He was seriously injured in a friendly match against Russian club Terek Grozny and therefore missed some matches at the beginning of the season. Fabrício made his Serbian SuperLiga debut for Partizan on 25 July 2015 against Jagodina in a 6-0 home win.

FC Ashdod
On 9 June 2017, he signed for FC Ashdod. He made his debut on 31 July against Beitar Jerusalem on a 3–1 loss in Toto Cup.

Omonia Nicosia
On 2 August 2017, Cypriot First Division club Omonia Nicosia announced the signing of Fabrício. He made his debut on 10 September 2017 against Ethnikos Achna on the 2017-18 season's premier.

Aktobe
On 23 February 2018, Kazakhstan Premier League club FC Aktobe announced the signing of Fabrício.

Hajer
On 28 June 2022, Fabrício joined Saudi Arabian club Hajer.

International career
Fabrício made two appearances at the 2009 FIFA U-20 World Cup, as Brazil finished as runner-up of the competition.

Career statistics

Honours

Club
Flamengo
 Campeonato Brasileiro Série A: 2009

Cruzeiro
 Campeonato Mineiro: 2011

Vitória
 Campeonato Baiano: 2013

Astra Giurgiu
 Supercupa României : 2016

CSA
Campeonato Alagoano: 2021

International
Brazil
 FIFA U-20 World Cup: Runner-up 2009

References

External links
 
 

1990 births
Living people
Footballers from Rio de Janeiro (city)
Association football defenders
Brazilian footballers
Brazil youth international footballers
Brazil under-20 international footballers
Campeonato Brasileiro Série A players
Campeonato Brasileiro Série B players
Bundesliga players
Serbian SuperLiga players
Liga I players
Israeli Premier League players
Saudi First Division League players
Sociedade Esportiva Palmeiras players
Clube Atlético Bragantino players
Club Athletico Paranaense players
CR Vasco da Gama players
CR Flamengo footballers
Cruzeiro Esporte Clube players
Esporte Clube Vitória players
TSG 1899 Hoffenheim players
FK Partizan players
Fluminense FC players
Paraná Clube players
Muangthong United F.C. players
FC Astra Giurgiu players
F.C. Ashdod players
Centro Sportivo Alagoano players
Associação Atlética Ponte Preta players
Hajer FC players
Brazilian expatriate footballers
Brazilian expatriate sportspeople in Germany
Expatriate footballers in Germany
Brazilian expatriate sportspeople in Serbia
Expatriate footballers in Serbia
Brazilian expatriate sportspeople in Thailand
Expatriate footballers in Thailand
Brazilian expatriate sportspeople in Romania
Expatriate footballers in Romania
Brazilian expatriate sportspeople in Israel
Expatriate footballers in Israel
Brazilian expatriate sportspeople in Saudi Arabia
Expatriate footballers in Saudi Arabia